Sahtu may refer to:

in Canada
Great Bear Lake (Sahtú in the Dene language)
Sahtu, Dene people living in the vicinity of Great Bear Lake, Northwest Territories, Canada
Sahtu language, spoken by the Sahtu
Sahtu Dene Council, that represents the Sahtu people
Sahtu Dene and Metis Comprehensive Land Claim Agreement, signed in September 1993, marking the resolution of the Sahtu Dene and Métis claims to the Sahtu area
Sahtu Region, an administrative region in the NWT
Sahtu (electoral district), an electoral region in the NWT

elsewhere
Sahtu, Iran, a village in Hormozgan Province, Iran